Church of St. Nicholas in Bačinci is Serbian Orthodox church in Vojvodina, Serbia. The church was constructed in 1805 at the site of an older church which was destroyed in 1760. The iconostasis carving was done in 1826 by Marko Konstantinović while painted decoration from 1831 is the work of Konstantin Pantelić. The Institute for the Protection of Cultural Monuments of Sremska Mitrovica adopted the initial decision on protection (no. 127) of 5 June 1967 while the building was listed as a protected cultural heritage of Serbia in 1997.

See also
Eparchy of Srem

References

19th-century Eastern Orthodox church buildings
Serbian Orthodox church buildings in Vojvodina
Cultural Monuments of Great Importance (Serbia)